Dion Lam (林迪安; Lam Dik-On) is a Hong Kong action choreographer and actor.

Filmography 
 1980 The Hangman
 1982 Energetic 21
 1983 Crazy Blood
 1988 Mistaken Identity
 1989 The Killer
 1989 Ghost Ballroom
 1989 Angel Enforcers
 1989 Blood Ritual
 1990 Return to Action
 1990 The Sniping
 1990 She Shoots Straight
 1990 Shanghai Shanghai
 1990 The Revenge of Angel
 1991 The Top Bet
 1991 To Be Number One
 1991 Inspector Pink Dragon
 1991 Fist of Fury 1991
 1992 American Samurai
 1992 Hero of the Beggars
 1993 Flying Dagger
 1993 Swordsman III: The East Is Red
 1993 Last Hero in China
 1993 Executioners
 1993 Ghost Lantern
 1993 Her Fatal Ways 3
 1993 Freedom Run Q
 1994 The Private Eye Blues
 1994 Return to a Better Tomorrow
 1994 Her Fatal Ways 4
 1994 Wonder Seven
 1994 Love on Delivery
 1995 No Justice for All
 1995 The Vengeance
 1995 Don't Give a Damn
 1998 The Storm Riders
 1999 A Man Called Hero
 1999 The Matrix
 2001 Exit Wounds
 2002 Awara Paagal Deewana
 2002 Infernal Affairs
 2003 The Matrix Reloaded
 2003 The Matrix Revolutions
 2004 Spider-Man 2
 2006 Daisy
 2008 My Mighty Princess
 2011 Overheard 2
 2014 Kung Fu Jungle
 2016 Kammatipadam
 2017 Shock Wave

Awards
 Hong Kong Film Awards (1999) - Best Action Choreography (nominated for The Storm Riders) 
 Hong Kong Film Awards (2000) - Best Action Choreography (nominated for A Man Called Hero) 
 Hong Kong Film Awards (2003) - Best Action Choreography (nominated for Infernal Affairs) 
 Golden Horse Awards (2003) - Best Action Choreography (nominated for Infernal Affairs)

References

External links
 
 Dion Lam interview from APV

Hong Kong male actors
Living people
Year of birth missing (living people)
Action choreographers